Mahalaxmi (Pronunciation: [məɦaːləkʂmiː]; station code: MX), also spelled Mahalakshmi, is a railway station on the Western Line of the Mumbai Suburban Railway in Mahalaxmi, Mumbai. Trains starting from  pass through Mahalaxmi. Major landmarks in the area are the Mahalaxmi Temple, Haji Ali Dargah, Nehru Planetarium and  Mahalaxmi Racecourse Dabbawalla Statue. Worli Seaface is also close from here. Byculla station of the Central Railway is the closest station.

The Saat Rasta Project will connect the  Mahalaxmi railway station to the proposed Jacob Circle monorail station.

The Haji Ali Mahalaxmi Project aims to connect the 225-acre Mahalaxmi Racecouse to the Arabian Sea, by creating a 6-acre public open space.

History
A workshop was established at Mahalaxmi in 1910 for the repair of wagons. In 1962 it was modified to work on carriages, and in 1976 it was adapted for Periodic Overhauls of EMUs. On 5 January 1928 Mahalaxmi station welcomed guests for the ceremony for the electrification of the Western Line.
Renovation was carried out in 1926 and the station was reopened on 3 October 1926.

Notes and references

Railway stations opened in 1867
Mumbai WR railway division
1867 establishments in India
Railway stations in Mumbai City district
Mumbai Suburban Railway stations